Martin Van Buren Montgomery (October 20, 1840 – November 12, 1898) was an Associate Justice of the Supreme Court of the District of Columbia.

Education and career
Born on October 20, 1840, in Eaton Rapids, Michigan, Montgomery read law in 1865. He served in B Company, Second Michigan Cavalry of the Union Army in the American Civil War from 1861 to 1862 and became a sergeant. He entered private practice in Eaton Rapids from 1865 to 1871. He was a member of the Michigan House of Representatives in 1871. He resumed private practice in Jackson, Michigan from 1871 to 1873, then returned to Eaton Rapids from 1873 to 1875. He continued private practice in Lansing, Michigan from 1875 to 1885. He served as Commissioner of the United States Patent Office (now the United States Patent and Trademark Office) from 1885 to 1887.

Federal judicial service

Montgomery received a recess appointment from President Grover Cleveland on April 1, 1887, to an Associate Justice seat on the Supreme Court of the District of Columbia (now the United States District Court for the District of Columbia) vacated by Judge Arthur MacArthur Sr. He was nominated to the same position by President Cleveland on December 20, 1887. He was confirmed by the United States Senate on January 26, 1888, and received his commission the same day. His service terminated on October 2, 1892, due to his resignation.

Later career and death
Following his resignation from the federal bench, Montgomery resumed private practice in Lansing from 1892 to 1895. He died on November 12, 1898, in Lansing and is buried at Mount Hope Cemetery, Lansing, Michigan.

References

Sources
 

1840 births
1898 deaths
People from Eaton Rapids, Michigan
People of Michigan in the American Civil War
Members of the Michigan House of Representatives
United States Commissioners of Patents
Judges of the United States District Court for the District of Columbia
United States federal judges appointed by Grover Cleveland
19th-century American judges
Union Army non-commissioned officers
19th-century American politicians
United States federal judges admitted to the practice of law by reading law
Burials in Michigan